John Haselrigge (d 1612) was an English politician in the 16th Century.

Hare was born in Noseley and was the brother in law of the  English jurist, politician and diplomat Bartholomew Clerke. He was  M.P. for Haslemere from 1588 to 1589.

References

Politicians from Leicestershire
1612 deaths
English MPs 1589